Azat Röwşenoviç Muhadow (born 21 June 1981) is a Turkmenistan footballer currently playing for FC Talyp Sporty as a defender.

Club career stats
Last update: 13 July 2008

References

External links

1981 births
Living people
Sportspeople from Ashgabat
Turkmenistan footballers
Turkmenistan international footballers
Association football defenders